Gini & Jony is an Indian kid's fashion brand, promoted by the Lakhani brothers, since 1980. The brand sells apparel through a mix of company-owned and franchisee outlets, and is currently present in 106 cities with 200 exclusive brand outlets and other large format multi-brand stores, like Shoppers Stop, Lifestyle Stores, Pantaloons etc. While the promoter group holds the majority stake in the organization..

Refer
6.http://www.top10in.in/top-10-best-gini-and-jony-boys-t-shirts-in-india-2016/

Children's clothing brands
Clothing brands of India